Dysopsis is a genus of plants in the family Euphorbiaceae, first described in 1858. 
It is the sole genus in subtribe Dysopsidinae. The genus is native to Costa Rica, Panama, South America, and the Juan Fernández Islands.

Species
 Dysopsis glechomoides (A.Rich.) Müll.Arg. - Chile, S Argentina 
 Dysopsis hirsuta (Müll.Arg.) Skottsb. - Juan Fernández Islands 
 Dysopsis paucidentata (Müll.Arg.) Lozano & J.Murillo - Costa Rica, Panama, Colombia, Venezuela, Ecuador, Peru, Bolivia

References

Acalypheae
Euphorbiaceae genera
Taxa named by Henri Ernest Baillon